Parochmastis is a genus of moths belonging to the family Tineidae.

Species
Parochmastis dromaea (Turner, 1926)
Parochmastis hilderi (Bradley, 1956)
Parochmastis phaeosema (Turner, 1918)
Parochmastis styracodes Meyrick, 1917

References

Hapsiferinae
Tineidae genera